Titia Bergsma (Leeuwarden, February 13, 1786 – The Hague, April 2, 1821) was a Dutch woman who visited Dejima Island, Japan, in August 1817 with her husband, Jan Cock Blomhoff. 

Under the Tokugawa shogunate's sakoku policy Japan was extremely secluded. The Dutch and Chinese were allowed to visit the country, but only for trade, and no women were permitted. The governor of Nagasaki allowed Bergsma to enter the island. Five weeks later when the shōgun Tokugawa Ienari became aware of her presence, he ordered that Titia and the wetnurse Petronella Muns had to leave. In December the women went back to Batavia and Holland and Bergsma never saw her husband again.

In the meanwhile, Japanese painters and sculptors had made 500 images of Bergsma. Her images had such popularity in Japan that they outsold all other prints in 19th century Japan. Images can be found all over Japan. There are companies which specialise entirely in Bergsma images. It is said her face can be seen on four million pieces of Japanese porcelain.

The life of Bergsma has been adapted to animation in Japan.

See also

Nagasaki-e genre of art about foreign women during Tokugawa era

Sources
R. P. Bersma, Titia. The first Western Woman in Japan (Amsterdam 2002)
Jolien C. Hemmes en Ennius H. Bergsma, Brieven uit Deshima, met het complete, originele verslag over de reis naar Japan van Jan Cock Blomhoff en Titia Bergsma met hun zoontje, plus 100 oude afbeeldingen, eerste druk 2017, tweede druk 2021, © JCH, ISBNnr: 9789090349473, NUR: 691, www.brievenuitdeshima.nl  (Publication with the original manuscript about the trip with his wife and son written by the father of Titia, using her letters to her parents.)

External links

 Digitaal Vrouwenlexicon van Nederland
 Historisch Centrum Leeuwarden

1786 births
1821 deaths
19th-century Dutch people
Dutch expatriates in Japan
People from Leeuwarden
19th-century people of the Dutch Empire